Zengel is a surname. Notable people with the surname include:

Len Zengel (1887–1963), American racecar driver
Raphael Zengel (1894–1977), American-born Canadian World War I veteran
Helena Zengel (born 2008), German actress

See also
Zenger (surname)